Carole Ann Loop Herrick (born December 25, 1940) is an American former professional tennis player.

Herrick grew up in Arcadia, California and played on the varsity team at Los Angeles State College, as a teammate of Billie Jean King. She featured twice in the singles main draw at Wimbledon (under her maiden name Loop). In 1967 she married her husband Philip Herrick. She is a member of the ITA Women's Collegiate Tennis Hall of Fame.

In her life after tennis, Herrick is the author of several books about the history of the Washington, D.C. area and has been an unsuccessful political candidate for Virginia's 34th House of Delegates district (as a Democrat).

References

External links
 

1940 births
Living people
American female tennis players
Tennis people from California
Sportspeople from Los Angeles County, California
People from Arcadia, California
Los Angeles State College alumni